This is a list of mayors of Akron, Ohio, a city in the northeastern part of the U.S. state of Ohio. 


Mayors of Akron

Administrators of Akron

Mayors of Akron 

Akron